Bumbleberry pie is a Canadian mixed berry pie originating from the Maritimes. It is made of at least three kinds of berries, but generally refers to a mixed berry pie, as there is no such berry as a "bumbleberry". This pie often also contains apple and/or rhubarb. Berries commonly used in this pie may include blueberries, raspberries, strawberries, and blackberries.

See also

 List of pies, tarts and flans

References

External links
 
Cuisine of Atlantic Canada
Canadian cuisine
Fruit pies